Adam Polášek (born July 12, 1991) is a Czech ice hockey defenceman currently playing for HC Sparta Praha of the Czech Extraliga (ELH). He was selected by the Vancouver Canucks in the 5th round, 145th overall of the 2010 NHL Entry Draft.

Playing career
Polášek went through the full training system of Vítkovice, and played the Czech junior leagues for the team, including the Junior Extraliga.

He signed his first professional contract with the Vancouver Canucks on April 7, 2011. Following the pre-season training camp, Polášek was assigned to start the 2011–12 season in the AHL with the Chicago Wolves

During the final year of his contract within the Canucks organization, Polášek opted to terminate his contract with Vancouver on December 25, 2013. He returned to his native Czech Republic and signed a contract with Sparta Praha of the Czech Extraliga on December 31, 2013. In 2016, Polášek signed with Sibir Novosibirsk of Kontinental Hockey League (KHL). On October 7, 2017, he joined Sochi of KHL. Polášek played out the season with Sochi, posting 7 points in 34 games.

As a free agent, Polášek opted to continue in the KHL, agreeing to a one-year deal with HC Neftekhimik Nizhnekamsk on May 2, 2018. In the 2018–19 season, Polášek contributed with a KHL career high 7 goals, adding 26 points in 58 games.

On 15 July 2019, Polášek returned to the Czech Republic as a free agent, returning to former club HC Sparta Praha on a one-year contract.

Career statistics

Regular season and playoffs

International

Awards and honours

References

External links

1991 births
Living people
Chicago Wolves players
Czech ice hockey defencemen
Kalamazoo Wings (ECHL) players
Ice hockey players at the 2018 Winter Olympics
Olympic ice hockey players of the Czech Republic
HC Neftekhimik Nizhnekamsk players
P.E.I. Rocket players
HC Sibir Novosibirsk players
HC Sochi players
HC Sparta Praha players
Sportspeople from Ostrava
Utica Comets players
Vancouver Canucks draft picks
HC Vítkovice players
Czech expatriate ice hockey players in Russia
Czech expatriate ice hockey players in Canada
Czech expatriate ice hockey players in the United States
Czech expatriate ice hockey players in Finland